This is a list of earthquakes in 2018. Only earthquakes of magnitude 6 or above are included, unless they result in damage and/or casualties, or are notable for other reasons. All dates are listed according to UTC time. Maximum intensities are indicated on the Mercalli intensity scale and are sourced from United States Geological Survey (USGS) ShakeMap data. In a busy year with 17 major quakes, Indonesia was hit particularly hard. More than 500 people died in Lombok in August and a major earthquake struck the Palu region in September, with more than 4,000 casualties caused mainly by liquefaction and a tsunami. Other deadly events took place in Papua New Guinea, Japan, Haiti, Taiwan and Mexico.

Compared to other years

An increase in detected earthquake numbers does not necessarily represent an increase in earthquakes per se. Population increase, habitation spread, and advances in earthquake detection technology all contribute to higher earthquake numbers being recorded over time.

By death toll

Listed are earthquakes with at least 10 dead.

By magnitude

Listed are earthquakes with at least 7.0 magnitude.

By month

January

February

March

April

May

June

July

August

September

October

November

December

References

External links
ShakeMap Background – United States Geological Survey

2018
2018
 
2018-related lists